Stickleback is a type of fish.

Stickleback can also refer to:

Stickleback (comics), series by Ian Edginton and D'Israeli
USS Stickleback (SS-415), United States Navy submarine
Stickleback class submarine, class of British midget submarines